Ottone Rosai (28 April 1895 – 13 May 1957) was an Italian painter born in Florence.

Biography
Rosai graduated from the Florence Academy of Fine Arts in 1912, a period in which he was closely associated with the Lacerba group of Florentine Futurists and especially Ardengo Soffici, with whom he held a joint exhibition at the Galleria Sprovieri, Rome, in 1914. Having returned to Florence after World War I, he adapted to the climate of the return to order and devoted himself to the study of early Italian painters. He held his first solo show at Palazzo Capponi in 1920, began contributing to the magazine Il Selvaggio in 1926, and took part in the Seconda Mostra del Novecento Italiano in Milan in 1929. Edoardo Persico organised a solo show of his work at the Galleria del Milione in 1930 and his participation in the Venice Biennale began by invitation with the 18th Esposizione Internazionale d’Arte della Città di Venezia in 1932. He obtained a teaching post at the Florence Academy of Fine Arts in 1942 and the Venice Biennale organised a large-scale retrospective of his work within the framework of the 28th Esposizione Internazionale d’Arte in 1956. He died in Ivrea (Turin) in 1957.

References
 Antonella Crippa, Ottone Rosai, online catalogue Artgate by Fondazione Cariplo, 2010, CC BY-SA (source for the first revision of this article).

Other projects

1895 births
1957 deaths
Italian LGBT painters
19th-century Italian painters
Italian male painters
20th-century Italian painters
Painters from Florence
20th-century Italian LGBT people
19th-century Italian male artists
20th-century Italian male artists